The Heralds of the Gospel (abbreviated to EP) is a Roman Catholic International Association of Pontifical Right which claims direct legacy of the Brazilian Tradition, Family and Property (TFP), and follows the beliefs of Plinio Corrêa de Oliveira. Founded by Msgr. João Scognamiglio Clá Dias, the organization is active in 78 countries.

History
The Heralds of the Gospel were founded out of the Tradition, Family, Property (TFP) movement by Msgr. João Scognamiglio Clá Dias, EP, who was close to TFP leader Plinio Corrêa de Oliveira, a monarchist political leader who held his ultimate goal to be the creation of an Religious Order of Chivalry.  Oliveira began organizing said order in the 1960s, under the name “Hermits of San Bento”.  Oliveria believed this religious order would be a commando force in an impending worldwide Catholic uprising.  Following Oliveria’s death, Cla Dias emerged as the new Superior and renamed the Hermits of San Bento to the Heralds of the Gospel on 21 September 1999.  The Heralds were recognized as an International Association of Pontifical Right by Pope John Paul II on 22 February 2001.

Consisting mainly of young people, Heralds of the Gospel is established in 78 countries. Its members practice celibacy and are dedicated to an apostolic life, living in separate houses designated for young men and young women. Their life of recollection, study and prayer alternates with evangelizing activities in dioceses and parishes, with special emphasis placed on the formation of youth. They also have a cooperator branch (formerly called companions in English) for those who cannot dedicate their lives entirely to apostolic works due to their own vocation, whether they are married, single or clerics.

Spirituality
The spirituality of the Heralds of the Gospel is based on three essential points: the Eucharist, the Virgin Mary and the Pope.
These points are represented in the emblem that distinguishes them. The three devotions can be seen in the symbol of the Heralds of the Gospel.

Their charism leads them to strive for perfection and for beauty in their daily actions.

Music 
Seeing in culture and art as effective tools of evangelization, the Heralds of the Gospel characteristically place special emphasis on both choral and instrumental music. Hence, the Heralds have formed various choirs and a number of concert bands to bring their ideology to the outside world.

The main musical ensemble of the Heralds of the Gospel; – the International Choir and Symphonic Band – was started in São Paulo with members united from a number of countries, which wear the uniform of the Heralds. This musical ensemble has traveled to numerous cities in the various continents, giving presentations in churches, auditoriums and stadiums to satisfy what they see as peoples' desire for beauty and spirituality.

Societies of Apostolic Life

As a further development of the charism, the family of the Heralds of the Gospel has given rise to two societies of apostolic life:
Virgo Flos Carmeli, the priestly branch of the Heralds, was born in 2005 with the ordinations of the first fifteen priests, including the founder of the Heralds of the Gospel.
Regina Virginum , the feminine branch was born later on Christmas of 2005.
Both societies received papal approval in 2009, becoming a clerical society of apostolic life of pontifical right and a feminine society of apostolic life of pontifical right, respectively.

"Arising from within the Heralds of the Gospel, and sharing the same values, the two new societies of apostolic life, however, have distinct natures. Virgo Flos Carmeli – "Virgin Flower of Carmel", in English – is characterized as a clerical society, in other words, consisting mainly of priests, while the society of apostolic life Regina Virginum – "Queen of Virgins" – is formed by women.

According to the Vatican decree, Virgo Flos Carmeli "is born amidst a loving and pertinacious catechesis on the Church and the Roman Pontiff, as well as respect for the importance of sacralization, to the greatest extent possible, of the values of temporal life." The decree goes on to state that the society is characterized by the defense of orthodoxy, purity of customs and the spirit of hierarchy, "as well as the desire to rekindle in humanity the distinction between good and evil (...)."

Virgo Flos Carmeli was founded by Msgr. João Scognamiglio Clá Dias, E.P., founder and president of the Heralds of the Gospel, and was erected by the then Bishop of Avezzano, Italy, the Most Rev. Lucio Angelo Maria Renna, on 15 June 2006.

Afterward, the Most Rev. José Maria Pinheiro, Bishop of Bragança Paulista, where the Motherhouse of the Society is located, requested Pontifical approval of Virgo Flos Carmeli from the Pope.

Regina Virginum, for its part, had its approval signed on 26 April 2009. According to the Vatican decree, the Society of Apostolic Life of Pontifical Right, also founded by Msgr. João Scognamiglio Clá Dias, "arose as an expression of the charism of the Heralds of the Gospel, applied to the specific conditions of feminine life, striving to manifest its own characteristics in a particular way within the secularised world."

Growth

       
The Heralds of the Gospel are growing, expanding their missionary activities to several countries and new cities in recent years. It is one of the fastest growing religious orders today.

Pope Benedict XVI said: "There are also, however, new Catholic awakenings, a dynamic of new movements, for instance, the "Heralds of the Gospel", young people who are seized by the enthusiasm of having acknowledged Christ as the Son of God and of bringing him into the world."

The first church entrusted to the Heralds was San Benedetto in Piscinula in Rome in 2003 and more have followed, with Our Lady of the Rosary, Caieiras, Brazil, the first honored with the title of minor basilica, in 2012. In 2014 the Heralds church Our Lady of the Rosary of Fatima in Embu das Artes, São Paulo, Brazil, was also named by the Vatican a minor basilica.

They also operate several schools and are in partnerships with several other educational institutions, such as the Lumen Veritatis Academy, of noted excellence in academics and Catholic religious education.

Many of the Heralds of the Gospel members receive the Sacrament of Holy Orders through the Society of the Apostolic Life of Pontifical Right Virgo Flos Carmeli., which enjoys numerous vocations.

Investigation by the Vatican
In 2017 the Vatican instituted an Apostolic Visitation of the Heralds under the direction of the Congregation for Institutes of Consecrated Life. On 12 June 2017 Msgr. Clá Dias stepped down as Superior General but continued to be "father" of the Heralds. The visitation found "shortcomings concerning the style of government, the life of the members of the Council, the pastoral care of vocations, the formation of new vocations, administration, the management of works and fundraising." As a result of the visitation, Pope Francis appointed Cardinal Raymundo Damasceno Assis, Archbishop Emeritus of Aparecida, as Pontifical Commissioner, to be assisted by Bishop José Aparecido Gonçalves de Almeida and Sister Marian Ambrosio I.D.P. in overseeing the Heralds and its two branches of consecrated men and women. The Heralds are "strongly linked to groups in the Church which oppose the reforms of Pope Francis."

An element in this investigation was a video presented by Andrea Tornielli, in an article published in the newspaper La Stampa, which showed several members of the Heralds of the Gospel listening to a description of an "exorcism". "In the video, a priest standing next to the founder read several claims made by a demon during an exorcism, claiming that 'the Vatican is mine' and foretelling the death of Pope Francis, causing some in the group, including Cla Dias, to laugh." At that time the Heralds issued a clarification note stating that this was an old video and that the leak had occurred improperly as it was for theological studies. It further clarified that all the appropriate steps had been taken under Canon Law and in light of the Catholic theology.

References

External links

Official site Canada
Official site USA
Central Site (Brazil) with links to other countries
Founder's site (in Portuguese)
TV site (in Portuguese and Spanish)
Instituto Teológico São Tomás de Aquino (ITTA) (in Portuguese)
Heralds' Academic posts (Portuguese)
Caballeros de la Virgen

 
International associations of the faithful
Christian organizations established in 2001
2001 establishments in Brazil
Tradition, Family, Property